Angel chimes, also known as angel-abra, are a form of Christmas decoration popular in Europe and North America. They apparently have the same origins as the Christmas pyramid, which functions on the same principle. They differ from these, primarily, in being mass-produced from metal and having bell-ringing angels, whereas Christmas pyramids are usually crafted from wood and do not necessarily have bells.

Function
Angel chimes have candle holders at the base which provide heat which turns a turbine at the top, which powers a series of trumpet-holding angel figures which "fly" around in a circle, striking bells beneath them. They usually have other decorative motifs, such as the Star of Bethlehem or a creche.

History

The earliest known patent for an angel chime was filed by Walter Stock of the German toy firm Adrian & Stock. The pre-World War II German-made chimes were usually made of tin and featured lithography.

In Sweden 

Christmas angel chimes are popularly known as "änglaspel" in Sweden.  After World War II, Swedish-made chimes became popular in both Europe and North America. These brought a simpler aesthetic in brass.

In Denmark
They are known as "Englespil" in Denmark.

In Asia
More recently, angel chimes manufactured in China has come to dominate the export market. The design now includes spinning candles.

United States
Angel Chimes USA (ACUSA) distributes The Original Angel Chimes which is manufactured by their manufacturer in Turkey, Aras Metals. ACUSA and Aras metals purchased the Original Molds from the family who first created them in Sweden in 1948.

In popular culture
There are a number of songs written about angel chimes, which include Angel's song, the Christmas Chimes. The sheet music has been compiled at the performing arts encyclopedia of the United States Library of Congress up to the present day. Ringle-rey, Shoo-hey by Birgit Ridderstedt also refers to angel chimes.

Nina Raine uses Angel Chimes in her play, Rabbit.

References

Christmas decorations
Candles